The Golden Crest was a greyhound racing competition held annually at Poole Stadium.

It was inaugurated in 1937 at Eastville Stadium in Bristol. Eastville closed in 1997 and the event was suspended until Poole resurrected it in 2000.

With the closure of the track on 22 September 2020 the competition was discontinued.

Past winners

Discontinued

Venues & Distances 
1937-1997	(Eastville, Bristol)
2014-2014	(Poole, 640m)
2000–2019	(Poole, 450m)

Sponsors
2011-2013 Dave Lawrance
2019-2019 Racing Post TV

References

Greyhound racing competitions in the United Kingdom
Sport in Bristol
Sport in Poole
Recurring sporting events established in 1937